Diver Dan is a series of 104 seven-minute live-action shorts made for children's television from 1960 to 1970. Made by Brian Cartoons, it was syndicated (mainly to NBC affiliates) and distributed by ITC Entertainment. The shows were sometimes re-edited into half-hour (including commercials) blocks by local stations.

The series featured the adventures of a diver in an old-fashioned diving suit who talked to the passing fish. The series was filmed in live action with puppet fish; the underwater effect was achieved by shooting through an aquarium.

Production
Diver Dan debuted in 1960, the brainchild of Philadelphia, Pennsylvania, cartoonist J. Anthony (John) Ferlaine, as a spinoff of his comic strip, Fish Tales. Ferlaine, who worked as an art director at Philadelphia's CBS affiliate WCAU-TV, produced two Fish Tales live-action marionette pilots. When CBS did not pick up the show, Ferlaine and promoter Martin Young partnered with Philadelphia producer Louis W. Kellman, who with his staff produced local TV spots and film shorts and filmed NFL football games.  They produced the shorts over nine months and syndicated them.

In New York City, Diver Dan shorts ran as part of Felix & Diver Dan, a 30-minute children's show airing from January 4, 1960, to August 31, 1962, which also included Felix the Cat. In Chicago during the 1960s, Diver Dan was regularly shown on the WGN-TV show "Ray Rayner and His Friends" even though Rayner would frequently read on-air letters from children requesting that he get other cartoons.

Main cast
 Allen Swift as the voices of many puppets, the unseen Captain Murphy and the narrator
 Frank D Freda played Diver Dan.   Freda is a playwright who received the Waldo Bellow Award for his play, Lunchtime. He has acted in a number of TV commercials, and was an early Ronald McDonald. Frank lived from 1936 to April 12, 2016. He performed in plays in Philadelphia and Broadway before Diver Dan. He made many Pall Mall and Budweiser commercials. In addition to acting Frank was a pioneer in sales of the cellphone, HBO cable TV company. He sold the first car cell phone in NYC for $20,000.
 Suzanne Turner as Miss Minerva, a mermaid, who referred to Diver Dan only as "the Diver" and shyly kept away from him.

Characters

Humans
 Diver Dan
 Miss Minerva 
 The Captain (heard but not seen)

Puppet Fishes
 Baron Barracuda - A predatory, ray-finned fish who wore a monocle in one eye, and spoke in a vaguely European accent
 Trigger - A idiotic trigger fish and always had an apparently unlit cigarette jutting from the side of his mouth
 Finley Haddock -
 Doc Sturgeon -
 Georgie Porgy -
 Gabby the Clam -
 Gill Espy -
 Glow Fish- 
 Goldie - the Goldfish who spoke only in peeps and squeaks
 Hermit Crab -
 Sam the Sawfish -
 Scout Fish -
 Sea Biscuit the Seahorse -
 Skipper Kipper -

Themes 
Honeymooners."The Ballad of Diver Dan"

The series opening and closing themes were written, performed, and sung by the show's sound engineer, Jack Sky, in a double tracked recorded voice.
Opening theme
Below in the deep there's adventure and danger;That's where you'll find Diver Dan!The sights that he sees are surprising and strangerThan ever you'll see on the land!

Following those opening lyrics, the narrator sums up the recent situation in a short group of rhymes, during the second half of the song as an instrumental, before the episode resumes.
Before the closing sung lyrics, the narrator brings up the new situation in a short group of rhymes, during the first half of the song, as an instrumental, as the episode concludes.

Closing theme
He moves among creaturesOf frightening features:Flashing teeth, slashing jaws,Flapping fins, snapping claws!He protects and he savesHis friends under the waves;That's where you'll find Diver Dan!

Episodes

Credits

Produced by Louis W. Kellman
A Brian Cartoons, Inc. production in association with Young Productions, Inc.
Executive producer: Hal Tunis
Associate producer: Harvey Blake
Created by J. Anthony Ferlaine
Writers included: Joseph Bonaduce, Ron Ronszel
Puppeteers: Martin Kreiner, John Caracciolo, Harold Taylor, Alfred Sandstrom
Directors: Leon Rhodes, Mort Heilig
Production manager: Ben Berk
Cameraman: Morris Kellman
Script supervisor: Ruth Clyman
Editors: Arthur Spieller, Margot Mor
Sound: Jack Sky
Art director: Frank Heininger
Lighting: John Wynn

DVD release
Alpha Video released two collections of Diver Dan episodes on DVD (Region 0).  All episodes in both volumes are black & white.

Diver Dan (Catalog # ALP 5152D, UPC #0 89218 51529 2, Release Date September 26, 2006)

 01 (Episode #34) THE BUBBLING PIT
 02 (Episode #35) THE VOLCANO
 03 (Episode #36) DEPTH CHARGE
 04 (Episode #25) GOLDIE'S HEROISM
 05 (Episode #26) DYNAMITE
 06 (Episode #27) GHOST IS CLEAR
 07 (Episode #37) SCHOOL DAZE
 08 (Episode #38) STRANGE VINES
 09 (Episode #39) SAVAGE SEAWEED
 10 (Episode #12) BARON'S CAPTURE
 11 (Episode #13) AN UNUSUAL TREASURE
 12 (Episode #14) TRIGGER'S REVENGE
 13 (Episode #20) RIDDLE OF THE HERMIT CRAB
 14 (Episode #21) SARGASSO SEA
 15 (Episode #22) LOST IN THE SARGASSO SEA

Diver Dan Volume 2 (Catalog # ALP 5710D, UPC #0 89218 57109 0)

 01 (Episode #01) HARD WATER
 02 (Episode #02) GOLDIE THE GOLDFISH
 03 (Episode #03) TALKING FISH
 04 (Episode #04) SKIPPER'S GOLD
 05 (Episode #05) TREASURE SHIP
 06 (Episode #06) SAWFISH RESCUE
 07 (Episode #32) THE STRANGE FISH
 08 (Episode #33) THE BOMB
 09 (Episode #23) CURRENT FLOW
 10 (Episode #24) THE STORM
 11 (Episode #11) TEETERING ROCK
 12 (Episode #40) THE MAGNET
 13 (Episode #31) CRAWLING DANGER
 14 (Episode #16) THE VERDICT
 15 (Episode #17) HORACE'S DILEMMA

Three DVD (Region 0) releases have also been produced by East West Entertainment LLC.  All episodes in all three volumes are black & white.

Diver Dan Vol. One (UPC #8 43156 02012 2)

 Episode #01 - HARD WATER
 Episode #02 - GOLDIE THE GOLDFISH
 Episode #03 - TALKING FISH
 Episode #04 - SKIPPER'S GOLD
 Episode #05 - TREASURE SHIP
 Episode #06 - SAWFISH RESCUE
 Episode #07 - SHELL-O-PHONE
 Episode #08 - THE OCTOPUS
 Episode #09 - MURDER INK

Note: Each of the first 8 episodes has its own chapter stop except for Episode #09.  It continues immediately after Episode 08.  Pressing >> skips Episode 09 and cycles back to Episode 01.

Diver Dan Vol. 2 (UPC #8 43156 02014 6)

 Episode #01 - HARD WATER
 Episode #02 - GOLDIE THE GOLDFISH
 Episode #03 - TALKING FISH
 Episode #04 - SKIPPER'S GOLD
 Episode #05 - TREASURE SHIP
 Episode #06 - SAWFISH RESCUE
 Episode #07 - SHELL-O-PHONE
 Episode #08 - THE OCTOPUS
 Episode #09 - MURDER INK

Note: Followed by five Van Beuren Corporation and three Fleischer Studios cartoons on Track 2.

Diver Dan Vol. 3 (UPC #8 43156 02015 3)

 Episode #19 - THE TRAP IS SPRUNG
 Episode #20 - RIDDLE OF THE HERMIT CRAB
 Episode #21 - SARGASSO SEA
 Episode #22 - LOST IN THE SARGASSO SEA
 Episode #23 - CURRENT FLOW

In other media
Dell Publishing issued a Diver Dan comic book, as issue #1254 (February–April 1962) of its series Four Color.  A follow-up issue, #2 was also published, dated June–August 1962.

In 1964, songwriter and record producer Tony Piano of Columbia Records put out a children's album based on the series titled Diver Dan and the Bermuda Onion.  With the exception of the theme song, which he legally borrowed from the series, Piano wrote the story, music, and lyrics for the album. His inspiration for producing it was his two young children at the time, who were 'hooked' on the Diver Dan TV series.  In addition to producing the album, Piano took on three of the roles: Trigger, Sam the Sawfish, and Skipper Kipper. Aiding Piano on the album was the comedian Del Close, playing the role of Baron Barracuda. "Birthday House" and children's album star Kay Lande played Minerva the Mermaid.

Legacy
The Nickelodeon animated children's show SpongeBob SquarePants seems to have been somewhat influenced by Diver Dan, either in directly parodying or by paying homage to it. In the SpongeBob SquarePants episode, "One Krabs Trash", Mr. Krabs goes to a graveyard to retrieve a "soda-drink-hat", and there is a gravestone that reads "Diver Dan".

References

External links
 
 
 TV Party: Lost Kids Shows

Television series by ITC Entertainment
1960s American children's television series
1960 American television series debuts
1962 American television series endings
First-run syndicated television programs in the United States
Fictional scuba divers
American television shows featuring puppetry
Nautical television series